Astartea affinis, commonly known as west-coast astartea, is a shrub endemic to Western Australia.

It blooms between November and January producing white-purple-violet flowers.

It is found along the west coast on undulating sites, seasonal wetlands, roadsides, creeklines and claypans in the Peel and South West regions of Western Australia where it grows in sandy-clay-peaty soils.

References

Eudicots of Western Australia
affinis
Endemic flora of Southwest Australia
Plants described in 2006
Taxa named by Barbara Lynette Rye